Patrick Pflücke (born 30 November 1996) is a German professional footballer who plays as an attacking midfielder for Swiss club Servette.

Club career
Pflücke joined the academy of 1. FSV Mainz 05 in 2011 from Dynamo Dresden. He made his 3. Liga debut with Mainz 05 II at 6 August 2014 against MSV Duisburg. On 19 December 2014 he made his Bundesliga debut against Bayern Munich replacing Pablo de Blasis after 81 minutes in a 2–1 home defeat.

On 5 June 2022, Pflücke signed a two-year contract with Servette of the Swiss Super League.

References

External links
 
 
 

1996 births
Footballers from Dresden
Living people
German footballers
Association football midfielders
Germany youth international footballers
1. FSV Mainz 05 players
1. FSV Mainz 05 II players
KFC Uerdingen 05 players
Roda JC Kerkrade players
Servette FC players
Bundesliga players
3. Liga players
Eerste Divisie players
Swiss Super League players
German expatriate footballers
Expatriate footballers in the Netherlands
German expatriate sportspeople in the Netherlands
Expatriate footballers in Switzerland
German expatriate sportspeople in Switzerland